Robert Adam Charles Koehler (April 7, 1894 – July 1, 1949) was an American football player who played fullback for seven seasons for the Decatur Staleys and the Chicago Cardinals of the National Football League (NFL).

References

External links
 Bob Koehler Bio (Staley Museum)

1894 births
1949 deaths
American football fullbacks
Chicago Cardinals players
Decatur Staleys players
Northwestern Wildcats football players
Players of American football from Chicago